Jeremy Spoon (born April 1, 1985) is an American mixed martial artist. A professional MMA competitor since 2008, Spoon has made a name for himself fighting in various promotions, including King of the Cage and Bellator Fighting Championships. Spoon was a competitor in the Bellator season six and season seven featherweight tournaments.

Mixed martial arts career

Background

Spoon holds a background in wrestling. He and his identical twin brother, Jerod Spoon, both competed in college, having started in seventh grade. In their junior year, Jeremy was state champion at 130lbs, whilst Jerod was runner-up at 135lbs.

Spoon was undefeated prior to joining Bellator. In that time, Spoon claimed a win over Jose Vega (a future Bellator tournament semi-finalist), a featherweight championship victory (and subsequent defense) in the Bricktown Brawl promotion and also defeated Donald Sanchez for the King of the Cage bantamweight (145lb) championship.

In mid-2011, both Jeremy Spoon and Jerod Spoon tried out for The Ultimate Fighter 14, which was the first edition of the show to feature bantamweights and featherweights. They tried out with the hope of being the first siblings to compete on the show, though coincidentally, whilst the Spoon siblings were not selected, two other siblings (Josh Ferguson and B.J. Ferguson) were.

Bellator Fighting Championships

Spoon made his Bellator Fighting Championships debut against the then-unbeaten Jerrod Sanders. He was victorious via submission (rear naked choke) in the second round.

Spoon returned to Bellator where he faced Adam Schindler. Spoon used his speed to his advantage, as he was able to land strikes on Schindler without response. In the final round, Schindler's face was bloodied, although the fight ultimately went to decision, where Spoon prevailed (30-27, 29-28, 29-28).

With that win, Spoon was selected to be part of Bellator's season six featherweight tournament. His quarterfinal opponent was Daniel Mason-Straus. Straus was considered the favourite going into the fight, due to his previous Bellator tournament experience, where he was the runner up of the fourth season featherweight tournament. During the fight, Spoon appeared to be noticeably smaller in stature than his opponent and it showed, as Straus was able to control the clinch and use his greater reach effectively with leg kicks to keep Spoon on the outside. Straus successfully took Spoon down twice and controlled the fight to a decision. Straus won the fight via unanimous decision (30-27, 29-28, 29-28).

Spoon then entered into the season seven featherweight tournament. His quarterfinal opponent was Mike Richman and he lost via a headkick KO in the first round.

Spoon returned to the promotion in 2018 and faced Juan Archuleta on November 30, 2018 at Bellator 210. He lost the fight by unanimous decision.

Championships and accomplishments
Bricktown Brawl MMA
Bricktown Brawl Featherweight Championship (One time)
King of the Cage
KOTC Bantamweight Championship (One time)
Sugar Creek Showdown
SCS Featherweight Championship (One time; current)

Mixed martial arts record

|-
|Loss
|align=center| 20–5
|Juan Archuleta
|Decision (unanimous)
|Bellator 210
|
|align=center|3
|align=center|5:00
|Thackerville, Oklahoma, United States
|
|-
|Loss
|align=center| 20–4
|Damon Jackson
|Submission (rear-naked choke)
|Legacy Fighting Alliance 40
|
|align=center|2
|align=center|3:59
|Dallas, Texas, United States
|
|-
| Win
| align=center| 20–3
| Ran Weathers
| Decision (unanimous)
| SCS 32
| 
| align=center| 3
| align=center| 1:51
| Hinton, Oklahoma, United States
| 
|-
| Win
| align=center| 19–3
| Johnnie Roades
| Submission
| Fists of Fury 7
| 
| align=center| 1
| align=center| 1:51
| Lawton, Oklahoma, United States
| 
|-
| Win
| align=center| 18–3
| Josh Tyler
| Decision (unanimous)
| SCS 25: Apocalypse
| 
| align=center| 5
| align=center| 5:00
| Hinton, Oklahoma, United States
| 
|-
| Win
| align=center| 17–3
| Rocky Long
| Submission (choke)
| Rage in the Cage 33
| 
| align=center| 1
| align=center| 1:45
| Oklahoma City, Oklahoma, United States
| 
|-
| Loss
| align=center| 16–3
| Ryan Roberts
| Technical Decision (split)
| VFC: Fight Night Harrahs
| 
| align=center| 3
| align=center| 5:00
| Council Bluffs, Iowa, United States
| 
|-
| Win
| align=center| 16–2
| Cody Carrillo
| Submission (rear-naked choke)
| Rage in the Cage 30
| 
| align=center| 2
| align=center| 3:03
| Choctaw, Oklahoma, United States
| 
|-
| Win
| align=center| 15–2
| Christopher Brooks
| Submission (choke)
| Fists of Fury 4
| 
| align=center| 1
| align=center| 1:41
| Lawton, Oklahoma, United States
| 
|-
| Win
| align=center| 14–2
| Chris Coggins
| Decision (unanimous)
| C3 Fights - Fall Brawl 2013
| 
| align=center| 3
| align=center| 5:00
| Newkirk, Oklahoma, United States
| 
|-
| Win
| align=center| 13–2
| Warren Stewart
| Decision (unanimous)
| SCS 18 - Declaration of Pain
| 
| align=center| 3
| align=center| 5:00
| Hinton, Oklahoma, United States
| 
|-
| Loss
| align=center| 12–2
| Mike Richman
| KO (head kick and punch)
| Bellator 76
| 
| align=center| 1
| align=center| 0:23
| Windsor, Ontario, Canada
| 
|-
| Loss
| align=center| 12–1
| Daniel Mason-Straus
| Decision (unanimous)
| Bellator 60
| 
| align=center| 3
| align=center| 5:00
| Hammond, Indiana, United States
| 
|-
| Win
| align=center| 12–0
| Adam Schindler
| Decision (unanimous)
| Bellator 56
| 
| align=center| 3
| align=center| 5:00
| Kansas City, Kansas, United States
| 
|-
| Win
| align=center| 11–0
| Donald Sanchez
| Decision (split)
| KOTC: Overdrive
| 
| align=center| 5
| align=center| 5:00
| Norman, Oklahoma, United States
| 
|-
| Win
| align=center| 10–0
| Ramiro Hernandez
| Decision (unanimous)
| Bricktown Brawl 6
| 
| align=center| 5
| align=center| 5:00
| Oklahoma City, Oklahoma, United States
| 
|-
| Win
| align=center| 9–0
| Jerrod Sanders
| Submission (rear-naked choke)
| Bellator 37
| 
| align=center| 2
| align=center| 0:26
| Concho, Oklahoma, United States
| 
|-
| Win
| align=center| 8–0
| Scott Bear
| Submission
| Apex Martial Arts - Bridge Creek Brawl
| 
| align=center| 3
| align=center| 0:31
| Oklahoma City, Oklahoma, United States
| 
|-
| Win
| align=center| 7–0
| Nathan Torrez
| Submission
| Bricktown Brawl 5
| 
| align=center| 2
| align=center| 2:52
| Oklahoma City, Oklahoma, United States
| 
|-
| Win
| align=center| 6–0
| Jose Vega
| Submission
| Bricktown Brawl 4
| 
| align=center| 2
| align=center| 4:42
| Oklahoma City, Oklahoma, United States
| 
|-
| Win
| align=center| 5–0
| Cameron Coffman
| Submission (punches)
| Bricktown Brawl 3
| 
| align=center| 1
| align=center| 1:04
| Oklahoma City, Oklahoma, United States
| 
|-
| Win
| align=center| 4–0
| Arnulfo Veloquio
| Submission
| Bricktown Brawl 2
| 
| align=center| 1
| align=center| 1:14
| Oklahoma City, Oklahoma, United States
| 
|-
| Win
| align=center| 3–0
| Chris Barnes
| TKO (punches)
| Harrah Fight Night
| 
| align=center| 1
| align=center| 1:44
| Harrah, Oklahoma, United States
| 
|-
| Win
| align=center| 2–0
| Nick Masters
| Submission (rear naked choke)
| Freestyle Cage Fighting 29
| 
| align=center| 1
| align=center| 1:47
| Claremore, Oklahoma, United States
| 
|-
| Win
| align=center| 1–0
| Wes Parkhurst
| Submission (punches)
| Freestyle Cage Fighting 24
| 
| align=center| 1
| align=center| 0:32
| Shawnee, Oklahoma, United States
|

External links

References

1981 births
Living people
American male mixed martial artists
Mixed martial artists from Oklahoma
People from Tuttle, Oklahoma
Lightweight mixed martial artists
Featherweight mixed martial artists
Bantamweight mixed martial artists
Mixed martial artists utilizing collegiate wrestling
American male sport wrestlers
Amateur wrestlers